Zelyonaya Dubrava is a rural locality (a settlement) and the administrative center of Rubtsovsky Selsoviet, Rubtsovsky District, Altai Krai, Russia. The population was 1,009 as of 2013. There are 11 streets.

Geography 
Zelyonaya Dubrava is located 7 km south of Rubtsovsk (the district's administrative centre) by road. Michurinsky is the nearest rural locality.

References 

Rural localities in Rubtsovsky District